Julia Zemiro's Home Delivery was an Australian television interview series, starring Julia Zemiro and produced by Cordell Jigsaw Zapruder.

Each episode featured Zemiro interviewing a celebrity or prominent person while visiting locations important to the interviewee, usually from their early life.

Zemiro and her guest often travel in vintage cars dating from the interviewee's youth. In early series, the show focused on interviewing comedians; then expanded to include a broader range of guests. The last episode aired on 10 July 2022.

Episodes

Series overview

Series 1 (2013)

Series 2 (2014)

Series 3 (2015)

Series 4 (2016)

Series 5 (2017)

Series 6 (2018)

Series 7 (2019)

Series 8 (2020)

Series 9 (2022)

External links

References

Australian comedy television series
Australian television talk shows
Australian Broadcasting Corporation original programming
2013 Australian television series debuts
2022 Australian television series endings